Ian Luccas Baroni Boetto (born 11 February 2003), known as Ian Luccas, is a Brazilian professional footballer who plays as a midfielder for Cruzeiro, on loan from Ferroviária.

Club career
Ian Luccas was born in Ribeirão Preto, São Paulo, and joined Ferroviária's youth sides in 2018, after representing Portuguesa Santista, Palmeiras and Rio Preto. He made his first team debut with AFE on 14 October 2020, coming on as a late substitute for Fellipe Mateus in a 3–1 Série D home win over Cabofriense.

Ian Luccas scored his first senior goal on 28 August 2021, netting Ferroviária's second in a 2–1 home success over Caldense, also in the fourth division. He featured regularly for the side during the 2021 Série D, as the club narrowly missed out promotion. 

On 16 August 2022, Ian Luccas moved to Cruzeiro on loan until July 2023, with a buyout clause; he was initially assigned to the under-20 side. Ahead of the 2023 season, he was promoted to the first team squad by manager Paulo Pezzolano.

Career statistics

References

2003 births
Living people
People from Ribeirão Preto
Footballers from São Paulo (state)
Brazilian footballers
Association football midfielders
Campeonato Brasileiro Série D players
Associação Ferroviária de Esportes players
Cruzeiro Esporte Clube players